The 2018 Missouri Tigers football team represented the University of Missouri in the 2018 NCAA Division I FBS football season. The Tigers  played their home games at Faurot Field as members of the Eastern Division of the Southeastern Conference. They were led by third-year head coach Barry Odom.

Previous season
The Tigers finished the 2017 season 7–6, 4–4 in SEC play to finish in a tie for third place in the Eastern Division. They were invited to the Texas Bowl where they lost to Texas.

On November 24, quarterback Drew Lock broke the SEC passing record for touchdowns in a season with 43, in a 48–45 win over Arkansas.

Preseason

Award watch lists
Listed in the order that they were released

SEC media poll
The SEC media poll was released on July 20, 2018 with the Tigers predicted to finish in fourth place in the East Division.

Preseason All-SEC teams
The Tigers had five players selected to the preseason all-SEC teams.

Offense

1st team

Drew Lock – QB

Albert Okwuegbunam – TE

3rd team

Emanuel Hall – WR

Defense

2nd team

Terry Beckner – DL

Specialists

1st team

Corey Fatony – P

Schedule

Roster

Game summaries

UT Martin

Wyoming

at Purdue

Georgia

at South Carolina

at Alabama

Sources:

Statistics

Memphis

Kentucky

at Florida

Vanderbilt

at Tennessee

Arkansas

vs. Oklahoma State (Liberty Bowl)

Rankings

Players drafted into the NFL

References

Missouri
Missouri Tigers football seasons
Missouri Tigers football